New Liskeard Airport  was a small privately owned airstrip near New Liskeard, Ontario, Canada.

References

Defunct airports in Ontario
Registered aerodromes in Timiskaming District
Temiskaming Shores